Francisco Regueiro (born 2 August 1934) is a Spanish film director and screenwriter. He directed twelve films between 1962 and 1993.

Selected filmography
 The Good Love (1963)
 Padre nuestro (1985)
 Diario de invierno (1987)
 Madregilda (1993)

References

External links

1934 births
Living people
People from Valladolid
Spanish film directors
Spanish screenwriters
Spanish male writers
Male screenwriters